Oligonol is a mixture of low molecular weight polyphenols found in lychee fruit. Oligonol is thought to have antioxidant and anti-influenza virus actions. In addition, it helps improve blood flow in organs, maintain muscle, reduce weight, and protect skin from harmful UV rays. Little is known about the long term safety of supplements containing oligonol due to the lack of scientific research.

References

Polyphenols